Haungtharaw River (Haungthayaw River) is a river of Kayin State, in southeastern Burma (Myanmar). It has its source in the Dawna Range and flows into the Gyaing River.

Notes

See also
List of rivers of Burma

Rivers of Myanmar